Willard F. Carroll (born November 12, 1955, in Easton, Maryland) is an American producer, writer, director, and animator.

Career
He was an executive producer of The Brave Little Toaster, The Brave Little Toaster Goes to Mars and The Brave Little Toaster to the Rescue, also writing the screenplay for the last two films.

He wrote and directed the Ragnarok-themed film The Runestone, the ensemble romance, Playing by Heart, Tom's Midnight Garden and the Bollywood pastiche Marigold. Playing by Heart was entered into the 49th Berlin International Film Festival.

An ardent fan of the Land of Oz, Carroll is recognized as having the largest privately held collection of Oz memorabilia in the world, comprising more than 100,000 items. Several books, including The Wizard of Oz Collectors' Treasury and All Things Oz, have been published displaying parts of his collection, which includes the Wicked Witch of the West's hourglass from the 1939 film.  He also wrote and produced the TV series The Oz Kids.

He established Hyperion Pictures with Tom Wilhite.

Director
1991 - The Runestone
1998 - Playing by Heart
1999 - Tom's Midnight Garden
2007 - Marigold

References

External links
 

1955 births
People from Easton, Maryland
Living people
Animators from Maryland
American film producers
American animated film producers
American animated film directors
American male screenwriters
Film directors from Maryland
Screenwriters from Maryland